Kliszów  is a village in the administrative district of Gmina Gawłuszowice, within Mielec County, Subcarpathian Voivodeship, in south-eastern Poland.

The village has an approximate population of 880.

References

Villages in Mielec County